Kaas is a surname. Notable people with the surname include:

 Carl Waaler Kaas (born 1982), Norwegian orienteering competitor
 Erling Kaas (1915–1996), Norwegian pole vaulter
 Frederik Christian Kaas (1725–1803), Danish admiral
 Frederik Christian Kaas (1727–1804), Danish admiral
 Herman Munthe-Kaas (1890–1977), Norwegian architect
 Hugo Munthe-Kaas (1922–2012), Norwegian intelligence agent and resistance fighter
 Jon Kaas, professor and scientist
 Ludwig Kaas (1881–1952), German priest and politician
 Niels Kaas (1535–1594), Danish politician and diplomat
 Nikolaj Lie Kaas (born 1973), Danish actor
 Patricia Kaas (born 1966), French singer and actress
 Preben Kaas (1930–1981), Danish actor

Danish naval officers
For a list of 17 Danish naval officers with this surname, see Kaas (Danish Naval Officers)

Danish-language surnames